Alex Landi (born September 28, 1992) is an American actor and model of Korean-Italian descent, best known for his role as Dr. Nico Kim on ABC's Grey's Anatomy.

Early life and education
Landi was born in New York City. His mother, Nana Landi, is Korean and immigrated to the United States at age 15 with her family, settling in the Northern Valley, New Jersey. Landi described his ethnic background as "Half Korean, half Italian". He attended Northern Valley Regional High School at Demarest in New Jersey.

Career
On September 6, 2018, it was announced that Landi was cast on Grey's Anatomy, Season 15, as Dr. Nico Kim, the series' first gay male surgeon, and first male surgeon of Asian descent. The multiple historic firsts of his casting landed him his first feature spread in Women's Wear Daily (WWD.com) in September 2018, followed by a feature cover in the February 2019 issue of Attitude magazine, and an article in the February/March 2019 issue of Da Man, an Indonesian men's fashion and lifestyle magazine. 

In 2019, Landi had a recurring role in the second season of Netflix's Insatiable. In 2021, he began portraying Bret Nam on The CW's Walker. 

He appeared in the music video for Doja Cat's 2021 single "Kiss Me More" featuring SZA.

Filmography

References

External links 

1992 births
Living people
Male actors from New York City
American people of Korean descent
American people of Italian descent
American male television actors
American male models
Northern Valley Regional High School at Demarest alumni

21st-century American male actors